Nowe Lipki  is a village in the administrative district of Gmina Stoczek, within Węgrów County, Masovian Voivodeship, in east-central Poland.

The village has a population of 110.

References

Nowe Lipki